Ronald Isiah Calloway (born September 4, 1976) is a former baseball outfielder who played two seasons in Major League Baseball with the Montreal Expos. He batted and threw left-handed.

Career
Calloway was selected in the eighth round of the  draft by the Arizona Diamondbacks. Prior to the  season, he signed a minor league contract with the Philadelphia Phillies and was assigned to their Triple-A affiliate, the Ottawa Lynx. On May 18, 2007, Calloway announced his retirement.

Calloway attended James Lick High School and graduated in 1994.

External links

Minor League Baseball
Pelota Binaria

1976 births
Living people
African-American baseball players
American expatriate baseball players in Canada
Baseball players from San Jose, California
Cañada Colts baseball players
Caribes de Oriente players
American expatriate baseball players in Venezuela
Edmonton Trappers players
El Paso Diablos players
Harrisburg Senators players
High Desert Mavericks players
Jupiter Hammerheads players
Lethbridge Black Diamonds players
Major League Baseball outfielders
Montreal Expos players
Norfolk Tides players
Ottawa Lynx players
Pastora de los Llanos players
Pawtucket Red Sox players
South Bend Silver Hawks players
21st-century African-American sportspeople
20th-century African-American sportspeople